Ethiopian forces in the Second Italo-Abyssinian War besides the Central Army were mobilized from various provinces under their local leader. According to 1935 Italian intelligence estimates of the Ethiopian provinces and their forces on the eve of hostilities, the Ethiopians had an army of 350,000 men. Strengths where known are noted followed by their leader. Modernized forces in Bold.

Ethiopian Army 1935  

Addis Ababa
 Emperor Haile Selassie 
 3 Battalions of the Imperial Guard Kebur Zabangna 
 Cadet school (Mobilized as a Guard battalion late in the war with Cadets as officers with militia soldiers.)

Northern front
 
Army of the Left - Ras Imru Haile Selassie (Grazmach = "General/Commander of the Left")
Gojjam Provincial Armed Forces (Sefari) - Ras Imru Haile Selassie 
 13,000 regulars
 Wolqayt and Semien Sefari - Fitawrari Ayalew Birru 
 10,000 mountaineers 
 Gojjam Levies - Dejazmach Gessesse Belew (later deserted, revolted)
 12,000 men 

Mahel Sefari (Army of the Center) (70,000 regulars) - Ras Mulugeta Yeggazu of Illubabor
 Amino Provincial Sefari
 Gubba Provincial Sefari
 Gurage Provincial Sefari
 Jimma Provincial Sefari
 Mui Provincial Sefari
 Om Hajer Provincial Sefari
 Sela Provincial Sefari
 Sodo Provincial Sefari
 Welega Provincial Sefari

Army of the Right- Ras Kassa Haile Darge (Qegnazmach = "General/Commander of the right")
 Begemder Sefari - Ras Kassa Haile Darge/Shum Wondosson Kassa
 53,000 men 
 Tigray Sefari - Leul Ras Seyum Mangasha
 15,000 men 
 Wag Sefari - Dejazmatch Haile Kebbede 
 7,000 men (1/6 with rifles)
 3,000 regulars with 3 machineguns, reinforcement 12/35 
 Lasta Sefari - Fitawrari Andarge
 ? men
 Yejju Sefari - Dejazmach Admassu Birru 
 ? men

Danakil region - Dejazmach Kassa Sebhat 
 400 trained men 
 100 regulars 
 5 machineguns 

 Later Reinforcements 

Ifrata Sefari - Ras Kebbede
 ? Shewan levies 
 
Welega-Ardjo Sefari - Bitwoded Makonnen Demissie 
 12,000 men (best armed of the Northern armies, also had Oerlikon AA guns) 

Kaffa Sefari - Ras Getachew Abate
 ? men

To subdue Gojjam revolt

Wollo Sefari - Crown Prince Asfaw Wossen Tafari 
 from Wollo - Nevraid Aregai 
 1,000 men 
 from Lekemt - Dejazmach Hapte Gabre Mariam Gabre
 1,000 men

Southern front

Ogaden 

Ogaden Sefari - Grazmach Afawarq Walda Samayat 
 less than 2,000 men - Fitawrari Badde / Balambaras Ali Nur 
 Some hundreds of Somali rebels - Omar Samanthar 
 2 Guard Battalions - Fitawrari Simu and Kebbede
 1,000 men with machineguns and mortars 
 9,000 walwal & warder. fitawrari Walde Amanuel.
 Total 12000 men.

Reinforcements
 
Hararghe Sefari - Dejazmach Nasibu Emmanual - C-in-C in Ogaden after Afewerq's death
 1 Guard Battalion
 Illubabor Sefari - Dejazmach Makonnen Endelkachew 
 12,000 men 
 Gemu Gofa Sefari - Dejazmach Abebe Damtew 
 3,000 men (described as having scarcely a modern rifle, with ocher and pink headdresses) 
Arusi Sefari - Dejazmach Amde Mikael 
 3,000 men (provincial levies)
 Kula Sefari - Dejazmach Hapte Mikael
 1,000 men

Webi Shebelle front 
 Bale Sefari - Dejazmach Beine Merid
 4,000 men 
 
Juba Front 
 Dolo Garrison - 300 men 
 Sidamo Sefari - Ras Desta Damtew
 20,000 men (well armed) - Fitawraris Ademe Anbassu and Tedeamme Zelleka 
 Guards Battalion - Qegnazmach Bezibibeh Sileshi 
 Oerlikon AA guns

See also
 Army of the Ethiopian Empire
 List of Second Italo-Ethiopian War weapons of Ethiopia
 Italian order of battle for the Second Italo-Ethiopian War

Sources 

 
 
 

Orders of battle
Military history of Ethiopia
Second Italo-Ethiopian War